"" (French for "The Zairian") was the national anthem of Zaire, from 1971 to 1997. The lyrics were written by Joseph Lutumba, and the music was composed by Simon-Pierre Boka Di Mpasi Londi.

Lyrics

Official lyrics

In local languages

See also 
 "Debout Congolais", the current national anthem of the Democratic Republic of the Congo

References

External links 
 Zaire: La Zaïroise - Audio of the national anthem of Zaire, with information and lyrics (archive link)

Historical national anthems
National symbols of the Democratic Republic of the Congo
Zaire
African anthems
National anthem compositions in E-flat major